Cyperus tempeae is a species of sedge that is native to parts of Mexico.

See also 
 List of Cyperus species

References 

tempeae
Plants described in 1994
Flora of Mexico